Musical performance may refer to:

 Audition
 Concert, the performance of multiple pieces by an ensemble or soloist
 Recital, a performance which highlights a single performer, composer, or instrument
 Concerto
 Musical composition, and the interpretation by performers
 Musical improvisation, as opposed to musical composition
 Musical technique
 Musical phrasing
 Network musical performance, a real-time interaction over a computer network that enables musicians in different locations to perform together
 Street performance or busking

See also 
 Piano history and musical performance
 Performance
 Music
 Performance art